Eric Thomas Stokes (1924–1981) was a historian of South Asia, especially early-modern and colonial India, and of the British Empire.  Stokes was the second holder of Smuts Professorship of the History of the British Commonwealth at the University of Cambridge.

He was the author of The Peasant and the Raj: Studies in Agrarian Society and Peasant Rebellion in Colonial India and The Peasant Armed: The Indian Revolt of 1857.

The Peasant Armed
The Peasant Armed: The Indian Revolt of 1857, as per note of editor Christopher Bayly, represented a major historical revision typical of British historians of the 1960-1970s, and were to be studies in the Lower Doab, Indian agrarian tracts covered by Chief Commissioner of Oudh, the Commissioner of Benares and Western Bihar in mid nineteenth century. The detailed treatment of the social origins of the revolt would have extended to all regions where mutiny was complemented by civil rebellion in 1857 - 59. Stokes however had not begun to write his conclusion at the time of his death in 1981.

As per Bayly, "in Stokes hierarchy of conditions for historical events of Indian Mutiny of 1857, ecology was the longue durée of Indian agrarian history in colonial period. Above this clustered a whole range of social and economic forces which determined the propensity to revolt and it was the specific decisions of British officers and Indian leaders which helped translate these propensities into historical action." "Stokes felt that history was generally a 'harmless pursuit' from which few general conclusions could emerge. His own view of political and social priorities derived not from historical theory but from a notion of natural law and from revealed religion.

The book chapters discuss the Military dimension of British strategy and tactics, as well of Sepoy Rebels, the Peasant World and British Administration. Stokes own passion for the links between sepoy mutiny and civil rebellion in 1857, are explored in detail, with reference to Delhi region, Haryana countryside, Meerut District, Muzaffarnagar District and Saharanpur district.

The India Connection
Bayly notes that, "Stokes returned again and again to the peasant world of India, by whose color and vitality he had been enthralled when serving as a subaltern in the Indian Mounted Artillery during the War. He completed detailed work on the Delhi area after visiting India in 1975-6. This visit seemed to prove to him the vacuousness of the broad caste categories."

Stokes and Caste as Category of Analysis
Bayly mentions that the chapters in "The Peasant Armed", demonstrate a slow modification of the notion that caste was the key category of revolt or, in any simple sense, the basic unit of Indian rural society. Anthropologists in Britain and America were themselves moving away from the monolithic view of caste.

Selected bibliography
.
.

Other references
Christopher Bayly, "Stokes, Eric Thomas (1924–1981)", Oxford Dictionary of National Biography, first published Sept 2004.

See also
Company rule in India
Thomas R. Metcalf

Historians of South Asia
1981 deaths
Alumni of Christ's College, Cambridge
1924 births
Smuts Professors of Commonwealth History
20th-century English historians
Fellows of the British Academy